Burrsville may refer to:
Burrsville, Maryland
Burrsville, New Jersey